Double Alibi may refer to:
 Double Alibi (1937 film), a British crime film
 Double Alibi (1940 film), an American crime film